Princess Dana Al Khalifa of Bahrain is a Bahraini fashion blogger, businesswoman, and lawyer. She is a member of Bahrain's royal family, the House of Khalifa.

Early life and education 
Princess Dana was born and raised in the Kingdom of Bahrain as a member of the royal family. She received a bachelor of law degree from the University of London's School of Oriental and African Studies. She later obtained a master's degree in law from King's College London.

Career 
While at law school in London, Princess Dana was exposed to European fashion. After searching for a job in fashion after her move back to Bahrain, she founded the style blog The Overdressed in December 2009. She was named Harper's Bazaar Arabia'''s Best Dressed in the magazine's first issue. In 2011 she hosted her first pop-up event for an international retailer in Bahrain. In 2014 Princess Dana hosted her first event for London-based retailer Avenue 32. In 2014 she established The Overdressed Pavilion, which hosted seven international jewelers at Jewelry Arabia. Later in 2014 she was the first Arab blogger to be selected by Louis Vuitton to attend their 2015 Spring Season show in Paris, later becoming the first Arab ambassador for the brand. In January 2015 she was the first Arab blogger to be on the cover on Hia Magazine''.

In September 2018 Princess Dana walked in the Spring/Summer 2019 Dolce & Gabbana show in Milan.

Personal life 
Princess Dana is married  to Suliman Azzouni and has one daughter, Alia.

References 

Living people
Bahraini bloggers
Bahraini women writers
Bahraini lawyers
House of Khalifa
Fashion influencers
Alumni of King's College London
Alumni of SOAS University of London
Bahraini women bloggers
Year of birth missing (living people)